Columbus is a shopping centre in Vuosaari, Helsinki, Finland, right next to the Vuosaari metro station. It is owned by Citycon. The centre was completed in August 1996.

To the north of the shopping centre are located the Mosaiikkitori square and the Vuotalo cultural centre as well as the Vuosaari sports hall, and to the south of it are located the service centre Albatrossi and Cirrus, the highest residential building in Finland, which was completed in 2006.

History

The Paulig era (1996-2006)
The family company Paulig known for its coffee and spices owned land at the centre of Vuosaari. During the early 1990s depression in Finland, the company started building business spaces in the area by itself as it could not find any suitable investors.

The shopping centre was completed in autumn 1996, almost two years before the Vuosaari branch of the Helsinki metro and its three stations (Puotila, Rastila and Vuosaari) were put into use.

The expansion was started in June 2005 and was completed at Christmas 2006. Businesses located in the expansion part included K-Supermarket, Posti Group, Tokmanni, Jysk and the self storage rental company Cityvarasto.

In 2005, the total revenue of the Columbus shopping centre was over 65 million euro.

The Citycon era (2006-present)
In 2006, the shopping centre had about sixty tenants. Paulig sold the Columbus building, which was not part of its core business, to Citycon for 80 million euro. Paulig spent part of this money to building a new coffee roastery in Vuosaari.

A second expansion was completed in autumn 2007, with K-Citymarket as its main tenant. In autumn 2016, the K-Citymarket store in the centre was downgraded back to K-Supermarket.

No one was injured.

In February 2019, Paulig and Citycon made a preliminary business deal with Bonava about the lots located in Vuosaari. The area is located in Vuosaari, in the northern part of Aurinkolahti, between the metro station, the shopping centre and other activities in Vuosaari. Bonava plans on buying building rights of about  habitable space for owner-occupied and rental apartments.

Businesses
Numerous businesses related to daily groceries, clothes, beauty, the household and free time, as well as restaurants and services, are located in the Columbus shopping centre. Businesses in the centre include Alko, R-kioski, S-Market, K-Supermarket, Lindex, Hesburger, Subway, a pharmacy and Tokmanni. The newest tenant in the centre is Lidl.

Gallery

References

External links
 
 Official site

Shopping centres in Helsinki
Vuosaari